Mill Mountain is a mountain located in the Catskill Mountains of New York northwest of New Kingston. Mount Pisgah is located south of Mill Mountain and Burnt Hill is located east.

References

Mountains of Delaware County, New York
Mountains of New York (state)